Zunyi Medical University is a medical university in Zunyi, Guizhou province of the People's Republic of China.

History
The college was founded in 1947 as the Dalian Medical College. The college was relocated from Dalian to Zunyi and renamed Zunyi Medical University in 1969.

References

External links
Zunyi Medical College 

Universities and colleges in Guizhou
Education in Guizhou
Educational institutions established in 1947
1947 establishments in China